Lovin and Withers Cottages are a complex of five Bungalow/Craftsman style cottages located in Kingman, Arizona. The cottages are listed on the National Register of Historic Places.

Description 
Lovin and Withers Cottages are located at the corner of Eighth and Topeka Streets in Kingman, Arizona. The five cottages were built in 1916 in the style Bungalow/Craftsman style. The five cottages are investment property, back then rentals were known as investments. There are five workers’ cottages as a complex. The five cottages were added to the National Register of Historic Places in 1986.

It was evaluated for National Register listing as part of a 1985 study of 63 historic resources in Kingman that led to this and many others being listed.

References

American Craftsman architecture in Arizona
Houses completed in 1916
Houses in Kingman, Arizona
Houses on the National Register of Historic Places in Arizona
National Register of Historic Places in Kingman, Arizona